Route 204 is a finite two-lane east/west highway on the south shore of the Saint Lawrence River in Quebec. It is one of the longest secondary highways in the province. Its eastern terminus is in Saint-Jean-Port-Joli at the junction of Route 132 and the western terminus is in Lac-Mégantic at the junction of Route 161. Although it is numbered as an east/west highway, the road follows a north/south course from Saint-Jean-Port-Joli to Saint-Pamphile, where it then follows a mostly southwest/northeast course until Saint-Georges, where after crossing the Chaudière River, follows it in a north/south course until the source of the Chaudiere in Megantic Lake, in Lac-Mégantic.

Municipalities along Route 204
 Lac-Mégantic
 Frontenac
 Audet
 Saint-Ludger
 Saint-Gédéon-de-Beauce
 Saint-Martin
 Saint-Georges
 Saint-Prosper
 Sainte-Rose-de-Watford
 Sainte-Justine
 Saint-Camille-de-Lellis
 Saint-Just-de-Bretenières
 Saint-Fabien-de-Panet
 Sainte-Lucie-de-Beauregard
 Saint-Adalbert
 Saint-Pamphile
 Sainte-Perpétue
 Tourville
 Saint-Damase-de-L'Islet
 Saint-Aubert
 Saint-Jean-Port-Joli

Major intersections

See also
 List of Quebec provincial highways

References

External links
 Provincial Route Map (Courtesy of the Quebec Ministry of Transportation) 
 Route 204 on Google Maps

204
Saint-Georges, Quebec